Paul McQuistan (born April 30, 1983) is a former American football offensive guard. He was drafted by the Oakland Raiders in the third round of the 2006 NFL Draft. He played college football at Weber State.

McQuistan has also played for the Jacksonville Jaguars and Seattle Seahawks.

Early years
McQuistan attended Lebanon High School in Lebanon, Oregon, where he was a letterman in football. He was named as a second team All-Valley League selection as an offensive lineman, and was an All-Valley League Honorable Mention selection as a defensive lineman.

College career
He played college football at Weber State University in Utah, and was selected in the third round (69th overall) by the Raiders in the 2006 NFL Draft. His twin brother, Pat McQuistan also played at Weber State and was selected in the seventh round (211th overall) by the Dallas Cowboys.

Professional career

Oakland Raiders
McQuistan was named the starting right guard for the Oakland Raiders prior to the 2006 NFL season. After starting the first six games, he was benched for the remaining 10 games. In 2007, McQuistan moved over to right tackle, playing all 16 games and started six of them. He only played one game in 2008 before suffering an injury and being placed on injured reserve, thus ending his season. McQuistan was released on November 9, 2009.

Jacksonville Jaguars
He was signed by the Jacksonville Jaguars on November 21, 2009. On September 5, 2010, he was released by the Jaguars.

Cleveland Browns
McQuistan signed with the Cleveland Browns on October 20, 2010. He was waived on November 13, 2010.

Seattle Seahawks
McQuistan signed with the Seattle Seahawks on January 28, 2011. McQuistan won his first Super Bowl with the Seahawks, when they defeated the Broncos, 43–8.

Cleveland Browns (second stint)
On March 24, 2014, he signed a two-year deal with the Cleveland Browns. He was released on February 13, 2015.

References

External links
Seattle Seahawks bio

1983 births
Living people
Identical twins
Players of American football from San Diego
American football offensive guards
Weber State Wildcats football players
Oakland Raiders players
Jacksonville Jaguars players
Cleveland Browns players
Seattle Seahawks players
American twins
Players of American football from Oregon